Chakkit Laptrakul (born 2 December 1994) is a Thai-French professional footballer who plays as a winger for Thai League 1 club PT Prachuap, on loan from Buriram United.

Honours

Club
BG Pathum United
 Thai League 2: 2019

Buriram United
 Thai League 1: 2021-22
 Thai FA Cup: 2021–22
 Thai League Cup: 2021–22

References

External links
 
 

1994 births
Living people
Chakkit Laptrakul
Association football forwards
FC Fleury 91 players
Chakkit Laptrakul
Chakkit Laptrakul
Chakkit Laptrakul
Chakkit Laptrakul
Tokushima Vortis players
Chakkit Laptrakul
Chakkit Laptrakul
J2 League players
Thai expatriate footballers
Thai expatriate sportspeople in Japan
Thai expatriate sportspeople in France